Clare College Bridge is the ninth bridge overall and the fifth River Cam bridge on its middle stream in Cambridge. The bridge now connects the Old Court of Clare College to Memorial Court, which was dedicated in 1926. It is a Grade I listed building.

It is the oldest still-functioning bridge in Cambridge, built in 1639-40 by Thomas Grumbold (d.1659).  It is one of two bridges left standing by the Parliamentarian forces in the English Civil War (the other being the Great Bridge) when Cromwell used stone from other bridges to refortify Cambridge Castle.  It was restored in 1969.

It is a three-span bridge in Early Renaissance style, built of Ketton stone ashlar. The balustrade has carved relief panels on the pedestals and is surmounted by ball finials. One of the fourteen stone balls has a missing section. Many different tales are told to explain the missing section of the globe second from the left on the south side of the bridge. The story most commonly cited by members of college is that the builder of the bridge was not paid the full amount for his work and so removed the segment to balance the shortfall in payment. A more likely explanation is that a wedge of stone cemented into the ball became loose and fell out.

See also
List of bridges in Cambridge
Template:River Cam map

References

Bridges in Cambridge
Bridges across the River Cam
Pedestrian bridges in England
Stone bridges in England
Arch bridges in England
Clare College, Cambridge